St. Luke's Episcopal Church is a historic Episcopal church located at 1514 15th Street, N.W., in Washington, D.C.  Completed in 1879, it is home to the oldest African-American Episcopal congregation in the city. It was designated a U.S. National Historic Landmark in 1976 for its association with Rev. Alexander Crummell (1819–1898), a leading figure advocating black self-sufficiency and civil rights in the mid-19th century.

St. Luke's continues as an active parish in the Episcopal Diocese of Washington. As of 2022, the Rector is the Rev. Kim Turner Baker.

Architecture
St. Luke's Episcopal Church is located west of Washington's Logan Circle, on the west side of 15th Street at its junction with Church Street. It is a masonry structure, built mainly out of Chesapeake bluestone with an ashlar finish and laid in random courses. It is covered by a steeply pitched slate roof. The main facade is symmetrical, with a large central entry portico consisting of two pairs of double doors set in a Gothic-arch surround, with a large Gothic-arched window in the gable above. Flank lower wings each have smaller but still substantial Gothic windows. The interior is finished in dark aok, and has a barrel vaulted ceiling with posts of iron and wood supporting the roof trusses.

History
In 1875, some members of St. Mary's Chapel for Colored People in Foggy Bottom and their rector, the Rev. Alexander Crummell of New York City and Liberia (where he worked for 20 years), left St. Mary's to found St. Luke's as the first independent black Episcopal church in Washington. St. Luke's was chartered as a Colored Episcopal Mission. Its neighborhood of Columbia Heights had numerous black families.

Calvin Brent, generally considered to be Washington's first black architect, designed the church after an Anglican church in Cambridge, England. Construction on the church began in 1876 and was completed in 1880.

The first service was held on Thanksgiving Day 1879. Alexander Crummell served as rector until his retirement in 1894.

See also

 National Register of Historic Places in the upper NW Quadrant of Washington, D.C.
 St. Luke's Church (disambiguation)
 Black church

References

External links

 St. Luke's website
 Diocesan Listing for St. Luke's Episcopal Church
 Alexander Crummell, 1994 Episcopal Calendar
 "St. Luke's Episcopal Church", African American Heritage Trail Register of Historic Places

Churches on the National Register of Historic Places in Washington, D.C.
Episcopal churches in Washington, D.C.
National Historic Landmarks in Washington, D.C.
Gothic Revival church buildings in Washington, D.C.
African-American history of Washington, D.C.
Churches completed in 1879
1875 establishments in Washington, D.C.
Religious organizations established in 1875
Dupont Circle